Jorge Luis Bonifacio (born June 4, 1993) is a Dominican professional baseball outfielder in the Kansas City Royals organization. He previously played in Major League Baseball (MLB) for the Royals, Detroit Tigers and Philadelphia Phillies.

Career

Kansas City Royals
The Kansas City Royals signed Bonifacio as an international free agent in 2009. He played for the Kane County Cougars of the Class A Midwest League, and appeared in the Midwest League All-Star Game. In 2013, Bonifacio began the season with the Wilmington Blue Rocks of the Class A-Advanced Carolina League. In the final weeks of the season, the Royals promoted Bonifacio to the Northwest Arkansas Naturals of the Class AA Texas League. After the season, they assigned him to the Peoria Javelinas of the Arizona Fall League. He was named to the Fall Stars Game.

The Royals invited Bonifacio to spring training in 2014. He played for the Naturals in 2014 and in 2015. He spent the 2016 season with the Omaha Storm Chasers of the Class AAA Pacific Coast League, and was selected to appear in the 2016 All-Star Futures Game.

Bonifacio began the 2017 season with Omaha. The Royals promoted him to the major leagues on April 21, 2017. He recorded his first major league hit and home run on April 23.

On March 10, 2018, Bonifacio was suspended 80 games without pay after testing positive for boldenone an anabolic steroid derived from testosterone. He returned in the second half of the season but struggled, hitting .225 with four home runs and 23 RBIs.

Bonifacio was designated for assignment on November 20, 2019. He was released on November 25, and became a free agent on November 27.

Detroit Tigers
On December 7, 2019, the Detroit Tigers signed Bonifacio to a minor league contract with an invitation to spring training. On August 19, 2020, the Tigers purchased Bonifacio's contract and inserted him into the lineup. Overall with the 2020 Detroit Tigers, Bonifacio batted .221 with two home runs and 17 RBIs in 30 games. On October 27, 2020, Bonifacio was outrighted off of the 40-man roster. He became a free agent on November 2, 2020.

On April 12, 2021, it was reported that Bonifacio had signed with the Mariachis de Guadalajara of the Mexican League. However the next day, Bonifacio’s representatives noted that Bonifacio had not signed with the club and was still a free agent.

Philadelphia Phillies
On May 25, 2021, Bonifacio signed a minor league contract with the Philadelphia Phillies organization and was assigned to the Double-A Reading Fightin Phils. Bonifacio hit .251 with 12 home runs and 41 RBIs in 49 games for Double-A Reading, leading to his promoting to the Triple-A Lehigh Valley IronPigs on July 22. After hitting .321 with three home runs and 13 RBIs for Triple-A Lehigh Valley, the Phillies selected Bonifacio's contract on August 20. After going 0-for-3 for the Phillies, Bonifacio was designated for assignment on August 24. On August 25, Bonifacio cleared waivers and was assigned outright to Triple-A Lehigh Valley. On August 27, after Zach Eflin, Luke Williams, and Andrew Knapp were placed on the Covid-19 list, the Phillies re-selected Bonifacio's contract. On September 3, Bonifacio was returned to Lehigh Valley and removed from the 40-man roster. On October 8, Bonifacio elected free agency.

On March 30, 2022, Bonifacio re-signed with the Phillies on a minor league contract. He played in 112 games for Triple-A Lehigh, slashing .240/.336/.407 with 15 home runs, 57 RBI, and 8 stolen bases. He elected free agency on November 10.

Kansas City Royals (second stint)
On March 9, 2023, Bonifacio signed a minor league contract with the Kansas City Royals organization.

Personal life
Bonifacio is the younger brother of Emilio Bonifacio.

References

External links

1993 births
Living people
Arizona League Royals players
Burlington Royals players
Detroit Tigers players
Dominican Republic expatriate baseball players in the United States
Dominican Republic sportspeople in doping cases
Kane County Cougars players
Kansas City Royals players
Major League Baseball outfielders
Major League Baseball players from the Dominican Republic
Major League Baseball players suspended for drug offenses
Northwest Arkansas Naturals players
Omaha Storm Chasers players
Peoria Javelinas players
Philadelphia Phillies players
Sportspeople from Santo Domingo
Tigres del Licey players
Wilmington Blue Rocks players